The 2003 All-Africa Games football – Men's tournament was the 8th edition of the African Games men's football tournament for men. The football tournament was held in Abuja, Nigeria between 4–16 October 2003 as part of the 2003 All-Africa Games.

Qualifying

The following 8 nations qualified for men's play at the 2003 All Africa Games. Two teams qualify from Zone VI replacing Zone VII.

Squads

Final tournament
All times given as local time (UTC+1)

Group stage

Group A

Group B

Knockout stage

Semi-finals

Third place match

Final

Final ranking

See also
Football at the 2003 All-Africa Games – Women's tournament

References

External links
2003 All-Africa Games – Men's tournament – rsssf.com

Tournament